The nineteenth season of American Dad! premiered on TBS on January 24, 2022 and started airing on late night block Adult Swim on January 30, 2022. and ended on December 19, 2022. It has been renewed for seasons 20 and 21. The twentieth season will premiere on March 27, 2023.


Production
At Comic-Con 2022, showrunner Matt Weitzman revealed the penultimate episode of Season 19, "Echoes" was intended to serve as the series finale, amid the restructuring of Warner Bros. Discovery's content, at the time leaving the show's fate in jeopardy.

Episode list

Notes

References

2022 American television seasons